Injury Time was a radio comedy programme, broadcast on BBC Radio 4 during the summers of 1980, 1981 and 1982, with a 1982 New Year's Special

The show starred Robert Bathurst, Griff Rhys-Jones Martin Bergman, Rory McGrath, Jimmy Mulville and Emma Thompson.

Sketches included Rory McGrath parodying Shaw Taylor in Police 5.

References

External links

1982-06-14 Felix: the newsletter of Imperial College Students' Union "Injury Time, A Radio 4 revue with Robert Bathurst, Jimmy Mulville, Rory McGrath, Emma Thompson and Griff Rhys Jones will be recorded on Sunday, May 16 at 7:15pm in the Union Concert Hall (free) Tickets available from Union Office"

BBC Radio 4 programmes
BBC Radio comedy programmes
1980 radio programme debuts
1982 radio programme endings